Tumi Robe Nirobe (English: your voice in the silence) is a Bengali romance television series which aired on Bengali General Entertainment Channel Zee Bangla. The show was telecast from Monday to Saturday.

Plot 
The plot revolves around the love story of two special people, Jheel (Shweta Bhattacharya) and Sanju (Shubhankar Saha). They are both disabled. Jheel is the lead dancer of a group called Taal. This dance group is again special because all the performers of this group are disabled. Jheel has a sister Dighi who is also disabled. These two orphan sisters are trying to live their lives against all odds. In the course of time Jheel and Sanju meet through Sanju's father (Arjun Chakraborty). How Jheel and Sanju develop the most special relationship is the story of Tumi Robe Nirobe.

Cast 

 Shweta Bhattacharya as Jheel Mukherjee (née Banerjee)
 Subhankar Saha as Sanjit Mukherjee aka Sanju
 Arjun Chakraborty as Jashojit Mukherjee
 Suchismita Chowdhury as Leela Sen Mukherjee
 Anusuya Majumdar as Jaya Bhattacharya
 Sourav Chakraborty as Biswajit Mukherjee 
 Sanjuktaa Roy Chowdhury as Rakha
 Tonni Laha Roy  as Dighi Mukherjee (née Banerjee)
 Rajiv Bose as Ranjit Mukherjee / Ranju
 Upanita Banerjee as Sneha Roy (née Mukherjee)
 Vikramjit Chowdhury as Neel Roy
 Kanchana Moitra as Rotee Roy
 Raja Chatterjee as Agnidev Roy
 Lily Chakravarty as Sunetra Lahiri
 Deerghoi Paul as Arna
 Malabika Sen as Malobika Sen
 Sagarika Roy as Chitrangada Basu
 Paean Sarkar as Roosha
 Amitava Bhattacharyya as Doctor

Former cast 
 Supriyo Dutta as Sadashiv
 Bhaswar Chatterjee as Abhishek
 Riya Ganguly Chakraborty as Sayori
 Palash Ganguly as Ranjit Mukherjee/Ranju
 Boni Mukherjee as Kalam
 Pushpendu Roy as Dighi's Fiancé
 Sanchari Mondal as Shruti; Ranju's Ex-fiancé
 Rita Dutta Chakraborty as Leela Sen Mukherjee
 Debraj Mukherjee as Debdutta Lahiri
 Sayantani Majumdar as Debdutta's Fiancé
 Pooja Ganguly / Sreemoyee Chattoraj as Sneha
 Raja Datta as Monty
 Pijush Ganguly as Bob Sen / Bhobananda
 Lopamudra Sinha as Kamli
 Ishani Das as Nayana
 Misty Das as Jhil's friend
 Debottam Majumder as Arjun Sen
 Uma Bardhan as Kalam's mother

Track list
Tumi Robe Nirobe (title song)
Ekta Porir Golpo
Kalar basi baje tobu radha ase na

References

External links 

2014 Indian television series debuts
Bengali-language television programming in India
2016 Indian television series endings
Zee Bangla original programming